Aulacocyclus edentulus is a beetle of the Passalidae family that occurs in Australia.

References

Passalidae
Beetles of Australia
Beetles described in 1826